Dafra is a sub-prefecture of Kélo, Tandjilé Region in Chad.

References 

Populated places in Chad